Juris Aploks (Yuri Yuryevich Aplok; April 21, 1893 – April 2, 1938) was an officer of Latvian Riflemen and later a Soviet Komdiv. 

He fought in the 2nd Riga Latvian Riflemen Regiment of Imperial Russian Army during World War I before going over to the Bolsheviks during the subsequent civil war. He was a recipient of the Order of the Red Banner (1928) and the Order of the Red Star. 

During the Great Purge as a part of the so-called "Latvian Operation", he was arrested on December 18, 1937, sentenced to death by the Military Collegium of the Supreme Court of the Soviet Union on April 1, 1938 and executed the next day. Rehabilitated on June 25, 1958.

Bibliography
 Гражданская война и военная интервенция в СССР. — М.: Советская Энциклопедия, 1983.
 Список лиц с высшим общим военным образованием состоящих на службе в РККА. — Пг.: Воен. тип. Штаба РККА, 1923.
 
 Удмуртская республика: Энциклопедия. — Ижевск: Издательство «Удмуртия», 2000.

Sources
 Биография на сайте РККА
 На сайте Мемориал

1893 births
1938 deaths
People from Skrunda Municipality
People from Courland Governorate
Soviet komdivs
Latvian Riflemen
Russian military personnel of World War I
Soviet military personnel of the Russian Civil War
Recipients of the Order of the Red Banner
Latvian Operation of the NKVD
Great Purge victims from Latvia
People executed by the Soviet Union by firearm
Frunze Military Academy alumni